Raphaël Lévy may refer to:

 Raphaël Lévy, a professional player of Magic: The Gathering, a trading card game 
 Raphael Levy (died 1670), a Jewish martyr
 Raphaël-Georges Lévy (1853–1933), a French banker, economist and politician